The Cook Islands women's national cricket team represents the Cook Islands, an associated state of New Zealand, in international women's cricket. It is organised by the sport's governing body in the country, the Cook Islands Cricket Association (CICA), which has been an affiliate member of the International Cricket Council (ICC) since 2000.

The Cook Islands made its international debut at the 2012 ICC East Asia-Pacific regional qualifiers for the World Twenty20, but lost every match, finishing last. They improved slightly at the 2014 edition, winning a single match (against Vanuatu) and placing fourth out of five teams. Their next major tournament is the women's event at the 2015 Pacific Games in Port Moresby.

In April 2018, the ICC granted full Women's Twenty20 International (WT20I) status to all its members. Therefore, all Twenty20 matches played between the Cook Islands women and another international side since 1 July 2018 have been full WT20Is.

History

Unlike in many other Pacific island countries, where women's cricket has been played alongside the men's game, women's cricket was only introduced to the Cook Islands in 2009. A high-performance program was established in the same year, with assistance from ICC East Asia-Pacific (EAP) and a New Zealand provincial governing body, the Northern Districts Cricket Association. The sport quickly gained in popularity amongst Cook Islander women, with significant numbers of clubs established in only a few years – in April 2014, it was reported that there were 600 female participants in the sport, out of a total population of 8,000 women. At the 2012 ICC EAP Development Programme Awards, the Cook Islands Cricket Association won the award for "Best Women's Cricket Initiative".

With earlier applications to participate in regional tournaments having been declined, the Cook Islands made its international debut at the 2012 EAP Women's Championship in Port Vila, Vanuatu. That tournament was played using the Twenty20 format, with the winner progressing to the 2013 World Twenty20 Qualifier in Ireland. The team joined the three sides from the 2010 tournament – Japan, Papua New Guinea, and Samoa – as well as Fiji and Vanuatu (also making their tournament debut). The Cook Islands lost all three of its group-stage matches by large margins, and eventually placed last after losing to Fiji in the fifth-place playoff. In the opening game against Samoa, they were bowled out for 36 from 12.1 overs, while against PNG they were all out for 47 from 17.3 overs.

In 2014, the Cook Islanders played several exhibition matches against club teams touring the islands from New Zealand, and were consequently invited to the 2014 EAP Women's Championship, despite their poor performance at the previous edition. The winner of that tournament was to qualify for the 2015 World Twenty20 Qualifier in Thailand. Despite fielding a young team, including four players under the age of 18, the Cook Islands dramatically improved upon its 2012 result, defeating Vanuatu in the fourth-place playoff by six wickets after bowling them out for 73. However, they were unable to win the subsequent third-place playoff against Samoa, and in the earlier group stages had lost all of their games. The Cook Islands' next major tournament is the women's event at the 2015 Pacific Games in Port Moresby.

In December 2020, the ICC announced the qualification pathway for the 2023 ICC Women's T20 World Cup. The Cook Islands were named in the 2021 ICC Women's T20 World Cup EAP Qualifier regional group, alongside seven other teams.

Tournament history

EAP Women's Championship
 2010: did not qualify
 2012: 6th place (6 teams)
 2014: 4th place (5 teams)

Pacific Games
 2015: 5th place (6 teams)

See also
 Cook Islands men's national cricket team

References

Women's national cricket teams
Cricket, women

Cook Islands in international cricket
Women's sport in the Cook Islands